Christine Morse (born 1973) is an American Democratic politician from Michigan. She was elected to the Michigan House of Representatives from the 61st district in 2020.

Early life and education
Morse was born in Tecumseh, Michigan in 1973. Morse earned a bachelor's degree from Michigan State University and then a J.D. degree from Wayne State University Law School.

Career 
Morse worked as an attorney from 1999 to 2002. Morse has served as the Kalamazoo County Commissioner representing the 9th district since 2018. In her campaign for the Michigan House of Representatives seat representing the 61st district, Morse was endorsed by former United States President Barack Obama. Morse is the first Democrat to win the 61st district since it was reestablished as a Kalamazoo County seat in 1993. Morse was sworn in as state representative on December 11, 2020 and assumed office on January 1, 2021.

Personal life 
Morse is married and has three children. Morse is a cancer survivor.

References 

Living people
1973 births
20th-century American lawyers
20th-century American women lawyers
21st-century American lawyers
21st-century American women lawyers
21st-century American politicians
21st-century American women politicians
County commissioners in Michigan
Michigan lawyers
Michigan State University alumni
Wayne State University Law School alumni
Women state legislators in Michigan
Democratic Party members of the Michigan House of Representatives